Hude may refer to:

People
 Anna Hude (1858–1934), first Danish woman to graduate as a historian
  (1851-1888), French politician
  (born 1954), French author with the French magazine Commentaire
 Hermann von der Hude (1830–1908), German architect

Places
 Hude, Lower Saxony, Germany
 Hüde, Lower Saxony, Germany
 Hude, Schleswig-Holstein, Germany
 Hude Ravne, Slovenia

Other uses
 another name for the Dghwede language, spoken in Nigeria

See also
 Hood (disambiguation)
 Hudde